Kiba Hydroelectric Power Station is a proposed  hydroelectric power station in Uganda.

Location
The power station would be located on the Nile River, downstream of Karuma Hydroelectric Power Station, but upstream of Murchison Falls.

Overview
The government of Uganda commissioned a study, titled Project for Master Plan Study on Hydropower Development in the Republic of Uganda, that was conducted by Electric Power Development Company Limited and Nippon Koei Company Limited, which was funded by the Japan International Cooperation Agency (JICA), in 2009. In the report of that study, published in 2011, three large hydroelectric power stations were identified for immediate envelopment, in the 2013 to 2023 time-frame, namely Isimba Hydroelectric Power Station, Karuma Hydroelectric Power Station and Ayago Hydroelectric Power Station. Two other stations were identified for development in the medium term, after the first three, namely Oriang Hydroelectric Power Station (400 megawatts), and Kiba Power Station (initially 200 megawatts).

Project development
On 27 May 2015 the government of Uganda signed a Memorandum of Understanding (MoU) with China Africa Investment and Development Company (CAIDC), calling for a detailed feasibility study that would lead to a Build, Own, Operate and Transfer (BOOT) agreement for the Kiba Hydroelectric Power Project and the associated transmission line works. In July 2017, more than two years from the MoU, with no tangible progress, the Uganda Ministry of Energy and Mineral Development terminated the MoU. If this dam is to be built, a new investor will have to be sourced.

Other considerations
The JICA report outlined a possible phased approach, where the power station is built over a number of years and commissioned in phases, to conserve resources and avoid building over-capacity.

See also
 Oriang Hydroelectric Power Station
 Ayago Hydroelectric Power Station
 Isimba Hydroelectric Power Station
 Karuma Hydroelectric Power Station

References

External links
 Government power projects face dark future as Energy Fund dries up As of 8 June 2017.
 More hydro power stations in Uganda to be constructed As of 24 November 2015.
 Karuma power plant paves way for more stations As of 17 August 2013.

Hydroelectric power stations in Uganda
Nwoya District
Northern Region, Uganda
Proposed hydroelectric power stations
Proposed renewable energy power stations in Uganda